The ninth season of the American competitive television series BattleBots premiered on Discovery on June 7, 2019. This is the second season of Battlebots to premiere on Discovery Channel and the fourth season since the show was rebooted in 2015. Encore episodes debuted on Science Channel on June 12, 2019.

MLB/NFL Sportscaster Chris Rose and former UFC fighter Kenny Florian returned from the last three seasons to host this ninth season (and 20th year) of the BattleBots competition on Discovery. Also, Faruq Tauheed, and his unique introductions, returned as the arena announcer. Taking over for Jessica Chobot as the behind the scenes and pit reporter was Jenny Taft.

Judges

This season the judges will score on a 7 point scale: 3 points for damage; 2 points for aggression; and also 2 points for control.

The current judges are former BattleBots contenders, Derek Young, Lisa Winter, and Jason Bardis.

Contestants
This season marked the 20th year of the BattleBots competition. The largest field in the history of the show will feature 68 of the best heavyweight robots (weighing a maximum of 250 pounds) to fight head-to-head in the Battle Arena. Their goal is to earn a top 16 ranking and qualify for the post-season where there will be knockout rounds until a winner-take-all fight to crown the 2019 BattleBots World Champion. (The robot, Electric Ray, entered the BattleBots competition but did not participate after it failed to pass safety tests.)

The contestants hailed from all over the world from nine countries including: Australia, Brazil, Canada, China, the Netherlands, New Zealand, Russia, United Kingdom and the United States.

Desperado Tournament

Like the previous season, this season also featured the mid-season "Desperado Tournament", where eight bots who started the regular competition with a poor record had the opportunity regain their winning ways and get a second chance to battle it out tournament style in the battle box. The bot that won three fights in a row earned an automatic spot into the Top 16 and was the first entrant into the 2019 BattleBots Championship, and they also won the Desperado Tournament giant bolt trophy. The losing bots went back into the regular rotation to finish out their season.

Seeding
Minotaur (0-2)
WAR Hawk (1-1)
Black Dragon (1-1)
End Game (0-2)
Gruff (1-1)
Captain Shrederator (0-2)
Ragnorök (0-2)
Lucky (1-1)

Desperado Tournament Bracket

KO: Knockout
UD: Unanimous Decision

Desperado Tournament Quarterfinals

 The robot was the winner of the battle and moved on to the Semifinals.
 The robot was the loser of the battle and was eliminated.
KO: Knockout

Desperado Tournament Semifinals

 The robot was the winner of the battle and moved on to the Final.
 The robot was the loser of the battle and was eliminated.
KO: Knockout

Desperado Tournament Final

 The robot was the winner of the battle and moved on to the Top 16 Tournament Bracket.
 The robot was the loser of the battle and was eliminated.
UD: Unanimous Decision

Top 16 Tournament

Seeding

Bite Force (4-0)
Witch Doctor (4-0)
Hydra (4-0)
Tombstone (3-1)
Whiplash (3-1)
DeathRoll (4-0)
SawBlaze (3-1)
Black Dragon (4-1)
Lock-Jaw (4-1)
Son of Whyachi (4-1)
Yeti (4-1)
HUGE (4-1)
Quantum (3-2)
Minotaur (4-3)
Blacksmith (3-2)
Uppercut  (4-1)

Top 16 Tournament Bracket 

KO: Knockout
UD: Unanimous Decision
SD: Split Decision

Round of 16

 The robot was the winner of the battle and moved on to the Quarterfinals.
 The robot was the loser of the battle and was eliminated.
KO: Knockout
UD: Unanimous Decision
SD: Split Decision

Quarterfinals

 The robot was the winner of the battle and moved on to the Semifinals.
 The robot was the loser of the battle and was eliminated.
KO: Knockout

Semi-finals

 The robot was the winner of the battle.
 The robot was the loser of the battle.
KO: Knockout
SD: Split Decision

2019 World Championship

 The robot was the winner of the battle and became the champion of BattleBots 2019.
KO: Knockout

Standings
As of Episode 13:

Episodes

References

2019 American television seasons
BattleBots